The Coast at Cagnes, Sea, Mountains, is a painting by Pierre-Auguste Renoir. It was bequeathed by Leopold Moller in 1999 to the Friends of Bristol Art Gallery who passed it to Bristol City Council for display in Bristol Museum.

Although it has been auctioned by Nazis, the UK Commission rejected a claim for restitution. In its report, the Spoliation Advisory Panel stated: "The Painting, which by 1935 was owned by Margraf, was sold at a "Jew auction" to an unknown buyer by the Berlin auction house of Paul Graupe on 12 October 1935."

References

Paintings by Pierre-Auguste Renoir
Water in art